Jon Trondson Benkestok (1530 - circa 1593) was a Norwegian nobleman  (Adelsmann)  and a member of the Benkestok family, one of the original noble families of Norway.

Family background
Jon Trondson Benkestok was reported to be a direct descendant of Harald Gille, King of Norway. Most of his ancestors served as knights in the king's army of Norway. The Benkestok family was married into the Norwegian noble families Smør, Galte (later: Galtung) and Kane, which were the original Norwegian noble families. The common ancestral of the Benkestok family was Gaut at Ænes in Hardanger, born circa 1100. He was a lendmann  and his son Jon Gautsson was a lendmann in the service of King Magnus Erlingsson.

Biography
Jon Trondson Benkestok was the son of Trond Torleivsson Benkestok and Anna Jonsdotter Haard. Both of his parents were born of very high station. He had a younger brother named Tord and three sisters Adelus, Kristin and Brynild. After his father died on 14 February  1558, in Vanse, Jon inherited large estates in Nordland. His mother died on November 27, 1569 in Bergen, Norway, she was buried on November 30, 1569 in the Bergen Cathedral in Bergen, Norway.

Jon Trondson Benkestok  was a signatory when King Christian IV was hailed by the Norwegian nobility at Akershus Castle in 1591. He signed the document with the family's signet ring. He probabely died around the year 1593.

Marriage and issue
Jon Benkestok married  a so-called "unfree" woman, Birgitte Nilsdotter, and their children lost their noble status and was commoners. Known children were:
Torolf († 1622; died without children).
Anders († after 1630; married, no known children).
Trond († 1626; had a daughter).
Johan († unknown; had a daughter).
Christopher († after 1618; had two sons).
Niels († after 1599).
Anna († after 1599).
Margrethe († unknown; married, had several descendants).

References

Notes
 Danmarks Adels Aarbog 1887 (Yearbook of the Danish nobility) 
Suhms Samlinger til den Danske Historie, 2. bind, II s. 99.

Other sources
 Brandt, Wilhelmine  Slægten Benkestok    original edition: Christiania 1904. facsimile ed. 1997 (Oslo. Damms antikvariat) .

1530 births
1593 deaths
16th-century Norwegian nobility
Benkestok family